Chholas Sadat is a village in Delhi NCR in the Indian state of Uttar pradesh.

According to the 2011 census information, the location code or village code of Chholas village is 120197. Chholas is located in Tehsil Dadri, District Gautam Buddha Nagar in Uttar Pradesh. It is situated 14 km away from sub-district headquarter Dadri and 24 km away from district headquarter Gautam Buddha Nagar.

The village covers 653.04 hectares and  has a total population of 6,192. There are about 993 houses in the village. The nearest town is Dadri.

References

Villages in Gautam Buddh Nagar district